Midnight Creek is a river in the Canadian province of Saskatchewan. The river begins in the heart of the Porcupine Hills and of the Manitoba Escarpment and heads in a generally south-east direction through the Porcupine Provincial Forest before emptying into Elbow Lake. A short river connects Elbow Lake to Woody Lake, which is the source for Woody River. Highway 980 follows the river for much of its course.

Midnight Creek travels through boreal forest, muskeg, and connects many lakes of Porcupine Hills Provincial Park including Isbister, Spirit, Island, and Elbow Lakes. Halliday, Isbister, and Midnight Lakes are along the river's course. Island Creek, which comes from Island and Spirit Lakes, meets up with Midnight Creek just upstream from Midnight Lake.

See also 
List of rivers of Saskatchewan
Tourism in Saskatchewan
Hudson Bay drainage basin

References 

Rivers of Saskatchewan
Hudson Bay No. 394, Saskatchewan